Nottingham Central was a borough constituency in the city of Nottingham.  It returned one Member of Parliament to the House of Commons of the Parliament of the United Kingdom.

The constituency was created for the 1918 general election, and abolished for the February 1974 general election.

Boundaries 
1918–1950: The County Borough of Nottingham wards of Forest, Market, Robin Hood, St Ann's, and Sherwood.

1950–1955: The County Borough of Nottingham wards of Forest, Market, Robin Hood, St Mary's, and Sherwood, and the Rural District of Nottingham.

1955–1974: The County Borough of Nottingham wards of Forest, Manvers, Market, Radford, and St Ann's, and the Rural District of Nottingham.

Members of Parliament

Election results

Elections in the 1910s

Elections in the 1920s

Elections 1930–45 

Another general election was required to take place before the end of 1940. The political parties had been making preparations for an election to take place from 1939 and by the end of that year, Terence O'Connor had been selected by the Conservatives and Geoffrey de Freitas by Labour.

After O'Connor's death in May 1940, a by-election was held in July, at which Frederick Sykes was returned unopposed for the Conservatives.

Elections 1950–70

See also 
 1930 Nottingham Central by-election
 1940 Nottingham Central by-election

References 

Politics of Nottingham
Parliamentary constituencies in Nottinghamshire (historic)
Constituencies of the Parliament of the United Kingdom established in 1918
Constituencies of the Parliament of the United Kingdom disestablished in 1974